Streblote diluta is a species of moth in the family Lasiocampidae first described by Per Olof Christopher Aurivillius in 1905.

Distribution
This species is known from Nigeria and Sudan or Chad

The larvae feed on Balanites aegyptiaca (Balanitaceae).

Types 
Taragama diluta and Streblote dysimata are the con-specific of the Streblota diluta, all found in the arid zones of Sudan. Only females of the species had been described; male of these species are still unknown. It is assumed that appearance of the males would be different according to pattern, color and size.

References

Moths described in 1905
Lasiocampidae